Denise Ellen Kirschner is an American mathematical biologist and immunologist whose research topics include granulomas, HIV, tuberculosis, and the mechanisms by which disease pathogens interact with and persist in their hosts. She is a professor of microbiology and immunology at the University of Michigan, co-editor-in-chief of the Journal of Theoretical Biology, and former president of the Society for Mathematical Biology.

Education and career
Kirschner graduated from Tulane University in 1985, and completed her Ph.D. there in 1991. Her dissertation, Mathematical Modeling of the AIDS Virus in Epidemiology and Immunology, was jointly supervised by Jerome Goldstein and James (Mac) Hyman.

After postdoctoral research at Vanderbilt University, she was an assistant professor at Texas A&M University from 1994 to 1997 before moving to the University of Michigan.

She was president of the Society for Mathematical Biology from 2017 to 2019.

Recognition
Kirschner was listed as one of the inaugural Fellows of the Society for Mathematical Biology, in the class of 2017. She was named a SIAM Fellow in the 2021 class of fellows, "for contributions to modeling pathogen-host interactions and host immune response in infectious diseases and training in mathematical biology/immunology".

References

External links
Kirschner Lab

Year of birth missing (living people)
Living people
20th-century American mathematicians
21st-century American mathematicians
American women mathematicians
American biologists
American women biologists
Theoretical biologists
Tulane University alumni
Texas A&M University faculty
University of Michigan faculty
Fellows of the Society for Industrial and Applied Mathematics
20th-century American women
21st-century American women